Ātiamuri Power Station is a hydroelectric power station on the Waikato River, in the North Island of New Zealand. It is the third of eight hydroelectric power stations on the Waikato River. The station can easily be seen from State Highway 1 between Taupō and Tokoroa.

The relatively small storage of Lake Ātiamuri means the timing of Ātiamuri's generation production is critical, particularly if Ōhakuri is generating at full capacity.

Ātiamuri, like all of the hydroelectric power stations on the Waikato River, is operated by state-owned electricity generator Mercury Energy.

History
Ātiamuri was the fifth hydroelectric power station on the Waikato River to be built. Construction of the station, as well as Ōhakuri and Waipāpa, was approved by the Government, and construction of the dam and power station began in November 1953. The Government engaged design consultants Sir Alexander Gibb & Partners of London for design of the civil engineering works.

Most of the workers were housed on-site in the newly created Atiamuri Village, with other workers coming from Mangakino, the base of the constriction of the upper Waikato River hydroelectric stations. The village of Ātiamuri contained 500 homes, a cinema, recreation room, canteen and library.

Construction of Ātiamuri was completed six months ahead of schedule, and the first three turbines and generators were commissioned in November 1958. A fourth turbine and generator was installed later, and commissioned in April 1962.

Dam
Ātiamuri consists of a combined concrete gravity dam to the north and an earth embankment dam to the south.

It is made of sandy clay and gravel, with the upstream side made of boulder riprap to protect against wave action.

The concrete dam contains the penstocks and the powerhouse, which are contained within the concrete gravity dam.

In 2017 the height of the dam was increased to reduce the risk of wave over-topping. A parapet wall was constructed into the original earth dam linking the original dam core material to a new concrete wall. To increase the height of the concrete gravity dam, steel plates were installed to the face of the dam.

Generation
The water from the penstocks turn four Francis turbines, each rotating at 126 rpm. Water from here is then deposited back into the Waikato River.

Each of the turbines turns a generator, each producing  of electricity at 11,000 volts. Electricity from the generators is stepped up to 220 kV by four transformers, each rated at 23,333 kVA.

Transmission
Ātiamuri contributes its electricity directly into Transpower's 220 kV grid. The station connects to the single-circuit Wairakei to Whakamaru A line (WRK-WKM-A) at the substation to the south of the powerhouse, with electricity being distributed to Taupo and the southern Waikato, and further north to Hamilton and Auckland. Ātiamuri electricity also is distributed to the Bay of Plenty via the twin-circuit Ātiamuri to Tārukenga (near Rotorua) line (ATI-TRK-A) originating from the power station.

References

Further reading

External links

https://www.mercury.co.nz/why-mercury/renewable-energy/hydro-generation

Energy infrastructure completed in 1958
Hydroelectric power stations in New Zealand
Waikato River
Buildings and structures in Waikato